Macksville railway station is a heritage-listed railway station located on the North Coast line in Macksville, Nambucca Shire, New South Wales, Australia. The station serves the town of Macksville, and opened on 1 July 1919 when the line was extended from Kempsey. The station is also known as Macksville Railway Station group. The property was added to the New South Wales State Heritage Register on 2 April 1999.

Platforms and services
Macksville has one platform. Each day northbound XPT services operate to Grafton, Casino and Brisbane, with three southbound services operating to Sydney. This station is a request stop for the northbound Brisbane XPT and the southbound Casino XPT, so these services stop here only if passengers have booked to board/alight here. A goods yard and passing loop were formerly opposite the station, until disconnected in June 2012.

Description 
The complex comprises a type 11 station building, completed in 1919; and concrete and steel platform faces, also completed in 1919.

Heritage listing 

Macksville is a modest site with a timber station building. It is typical of many small stations throughout the State and is a very good representative example of a north coast line station building and site.

Macksville railway station was listed on the New South Wales State Heritage Register on 2 April 1999 having satisfied the following criteria.

The place possesses uncommon, rare or endangered aspects of the cultural or natural history of New South Wales.

This item is assessed as historically rare. This item is assessed as architecturally rare. This item is assessed as socially rare.

See also

References

Attribution

External links

Macksville station details Transport for New South Wales

Easy Access railway stations in New South Wales
Railway stations in Australia opened in 1919
Regional railway stations in New South Wales
New South Wales State Heritage Register
Macksville, New South Wales
Articles incorporating text from the New South Wales State Heritage Register
North Coast railway line, New South Wales